Land vehicles by type and current level of use.

Light tanks

Out of service 
 M1 Combat Car
 Light Tank M2
 Light Tank M3/M5
 Light Tank (Airborne) M22
 Light Tank M24
 M41/A1/A2/A3 Walker Bulldog
 M551/A1 Sheridan (Armored Reconnaissance Airborne Assault Vehicle)
 T7 Combat Car

Experimental (Suspended/Cancelled/Completed) 
 XM8 Armored Gun System
 T92

Medium tanks

Out of service 
 M2 Medium Tank
 Medium Tank M3 Lee/Grant (all models)
 Medium Tank M4 Sherman (all models)
 M46 Patton
 M47 Patton
 M48A1/A2/A3/A5 Patton
 M48A4

Experimental 
 T20 Medium Tank
 T22 Medium Tank
 T23 Medium Tank

Heavy tanks

Out of service 
 Heavy Tank M26 Pershing
 Heavy Tank M103

Experimental (Cancelled) 
 Heavy Tank T1/M6
 Super Heavy Tank T28 (T95 GMC)

Main battle tanks

In active service 
 M1A1D/M1A2/M1A2 SEP Abrams
 M1A1HA Abrams

Out of service 
 M60A1/A3 TTS Patton Tank (Including RISE and RISE Passive vehicles)
 M1/IPM1/M1A1 Abrams (M1A1 Used For Reserve training)

Experimental (Suspended/Cancelled/Completed) 
 M60A1E1/E2/A2
 XM1202 MCS
 MBT-70

Armored cars

Out of service 
 Jeffery armored car
 M1 Armored Car
 M3 Scout Car
 M8 Greyhound
 M38 Wolfhound
 T7 Armored Car
 XM706 (wheeled)
 XM706E1/M706 (wheeled)
 XM706E2 (wheeled)

In service 
 M1117 Armored Security Vehicle
 MRAP

Experimental (active) 
 ULTRA AP

Experimental (Suspended/Cancelled/Completed) 
 XM800 Armored Reconnaissance Scout Vehicle

Armored personnel carriers, reconnaissance and fighting vehicles

Out of service 
 M2 Half Track Car
 M3 Half-track
 M5 Half-track
 M9 Half-track
 M59 (APC)
 M75 (APC)
 M114/A1 (full-track)

In active service 
 M113 armored personnel carrier
 M2 Bradley (infantry fighting vehicle)
 Stryker Interim Armored (fighting) Vehicle
 LAV-25 Armored reconnaissance vehicle

Landing vehicles, tracked 
 LVT(1) (G-156)
 LVT(2) (G-167)
 LVT(A)(1) (G-214) (Armored with 37 mm gun)
 LVT(A)(2) (G-168) (Armored)
 LVT(A)(4) (Armored with 75 mm howitzer)
 LVT(A)(5) (Armored with 75 mm howitzer)
 LVTP5
 LVTH6 (with 105 mm howitzer)
 LVTR1 (recovery vehicle)
 LVTE1 (engineer vehicle)
 LVTP7 (later AAV7)

Dedicated anti-armor vehicles

Out of service 
 75 mm Gun Motor Carriage M3 (T12) 
 M6 Fargo
 M10 tank destroyer
 M18 Hellcat
 M36 (tank destroyer)
 T48 Gun Motor Carriage
 M901 Improved Tow Vehicle

Specialist armored vehicles

In active service 
 M104 Wolverine (Armored Bridge Layer)
 M9 Armored Combat Earthmover
 M60A1 Armored Vehicle Launched Bridge (AVLB)
 M88 Recovery Vehicle
 M728 Combat Engineer Vehicle (CEV)
 M981 FISTV
 M93 Fox NBCRS (Nuclear Biological Chemical Reconnaissance System)

Utility Vehicles

Out of service 
 FWD Model B
 Gama Goat
 GMC CCKW
 Jeffery Quad
 M29 Weasel
 M39 Truck
 M151
 Mack AC
 Willys MB
 Willys M38
 Ford GTB
 Dodge M37
 M520 Goer
 M25 Tank Transporter
 Interim Fast Attack Vehicle

In active service 
 M939 Truck
 HMMWV
 FMTV
 MTVR
 L-ATV (Oshkosh Defense's JLTV winner (August 2015); manufactured unarmoured; Long Term Armor Strategy (LTAS) complaint (A-kit/B-kit))

Experimental 
 FMC XR311 (also known as GI Hotrod)

Self-propelled guns and artillery

In active service 
 M109A6/A7 Paladin (155 mm Howitzer Motor Carriage; Full-Track)
 M270 Multiple Launch Rocket System
 High Mobility Artillery rocket system

Out of service 
 M109/A1/A2/A3/A4/A5 (155 mm Howitzer Motor Carriage; Full-Track); (M109A5 Used for Reserve Training) 
 M108 (105 mm Howitzer)
 M107 (175 mm Howitzer)
 M110/A1/A2 (203 mm Howitzer)
 76 mm Gun Motor Carriage M10 (3"/76 mm Gun Motor Carriage; Full-Track)
 76 mm Gun Motor Carriage M18 Hellcat (76 mm Gun Motor Carriage; Full-Track)
 90 mm Gun Motor Carriage M36 Jackson (90 mm Gun Motor Carriage; Full-Track)
 Landing Vehicle Tracked (Armored) (LVT(A))1/2/4/5 (Amphibious Full-Track)
 81 mm Mortar Carrier M4/A1 
 M21 Mortar Motor Carriage
 T19 Howitzer Motor Carriage
 T30 Howitzer Motor Carriage

Experimental 
 XM2001 Crusader Self Propelled Howitzer

Mine Resistant Ambush Protected (MRAP) 
 M1117 Armored Security Vehicle
 Buffalo
 Caiman
 Cougar
 M-ATV (MRAP All Terrain Vehicle)
 MaxxPro
 RG-31
 RG-33

Specialized vehicles 
 LSV (Light Strike Vehicle)
 ATV (MV700, MV850)
 Desert Patrol Vehicle (still in use in small numbers by Navy SEALs)

See also 
 Vehicle registration plates of the United States Army in Germany
 Tank classification
 List of "M" series military vehicles
 List of currently active United States military land vehicles
 List of crew served weapons of the US Armed Forces
 List of vehicles of the United States Marine Corps
 List of weapons of the U.S. Marine Corps
 G-numbers

References 

U.S. armed forces
United States, land vehicles
U.S. armed forces, vehicles